Elvidge is a surname. Notable people with the surname include:

 Anita M. Elvidge (1895–1981), artist and First Lady of Guam
 Chris Elvidge (1892–?), English footballer
 Ford Quint Elvidge (1892–1980), Governor of Guam
 John Elvidge (born 1951), British civil servant
 June Elvidge (1893–1965), American actress
 Ron Elvidge (1923–2019), New Zealand rugby union player